The Yu is a river in northern Russia. It flows on the territory of the Komi Republic southeast in the upstream and southwest in the downstream from its source close to Chasovo, Komi.

The Yu flows into the Vychegda.

Rivers of the Komi Republic